Maria Nasu (born September 17, 1956) is a politician from Moldova. She has served as a member of the Parliament of Moldova since 2011.

References

External links 
 Parlamentul Republicii Moldova

1956 births
Living people
Liberal Democratic Party of Moldova MPs
Moldovan MPs 2010–2014